Richard Quirin (26 April 1908 – 8 August 1942) was a German agent executed as a spy for Nazi Germany in World War II. He was one of eight agents involved in Operation Pastorius, and gave his name to the Supreme Court decision on the trial, Ex parte Quirin.

Early life 
Born in Berlin in 1908, Quirin moved to the United States in 1927, living in Schenectady, New York. He worked as a mechanic during this time for General Electric. He lived in the United States from 1927 to 1939. During this time, Quirin joined the German American Bund and was an open supporter of the Hitler regime. In 1939, Quirin and his wife returned to Germany. Upon his return, he got a job with Volkswagen. He worked with Heinrich Heinck at the plant in Braunschweig, and the two became the first recruited by Walter Kappe, the publisher of the Bund newspaper Deutscher Weckruf und Beobachter, for what became Operation Pastorius.

Operation Pastorius 

After the men were recruited, they were given pseudonyms and false stories to blend in as they returned to America. Quirin's new identity was Richard Quintas, a Portuguese man who moved to Upstate New York from Lisbon when he was three. He was considered by Kappe to be a "cool, cruel man who would not hesitate to kill anyone to accomplish the mission's objectives." On 13 June 1942, Quirin was one of the first four to come to America as he, George John Dasch, Heinck, and Ernst Peter Burger landed on American soil on a U-boat. Several days later, when Dasch turned himself in to the FBI, he named Quirin as one of the "true believers" of the operation. On 20 June, Quirin was the first to be arrested, FBI officers surrounding him as he tried to escape.

Trial and execution 
At the trial, Quirin took the stand after Heinck. He stated that he did not know the purpose of Operation Pastorius, and was just interested in returning to the United States. However, a cross-examination showed that Quirin saw himself as a loyal Nazi and had made no effort to get out of the operation. Quirin was emotionless as he was sentenced to death, only displaying sentiment when telling a guard that he wanted his contacts to know Dasch had "ratted" him out. Quirin and the five others were electrocuted on 8 August 1942, and buried in a potter's field with numbered graves.

Quirin wrote a final letter to his wife and daughter prior to his execution:"These are the last lines I can write to you. I should like to tell you that I have always loved you and that I came here to make a better life for you, my dear ones. But unfortunately, God willed it otherwise. . . . Tell Kappe or one of his people that George Dasch and Peter Burger betrayed us. Begin a new life and think of me often."

See also 
 Capital punishment by the United States federal government
 List of people executed by the United States federal government

Notes

References

External links 

George John Dasch and the Nazi Saboteurs at FBI

1908 births
1942 deaths
Executed people from Berlin
German emigrants to the United States
German people executed abroad
Saboteurs
People executed for spying for Nazi Germany
Nazis executed by the United States military by electric chair